Maoyū Maō Yūsha, also known as Maoyu, is a 2013 fantasy anime based on the light novels by Mamare Touno and illustrated by Keinojou Mizutama and toi8. Set in a medieval fantasy world, a war known as the Southern Kingdoms War has been raging between the humans and demons for 15 years. The humankind's greatest warrior, known as the Hero, confronts and plans to finish the leader of the Demons, the Demon King, hoping it will end the war. To his surprise, the "Demon King" is actually a Queen and she explains the war between their people is not a war between good and evil and ending it now will only bring further chaos. Convinced, both of them work together to end the war another way that will benefit both sides from behind the scenes.

The anime aired from January 5 to March 30, 2013 on Tokyo MX. The anime is produced by Arms and directed by Takeo Takahashi, written by Naruhisa Arakawa and music is by Takeshi Hama. The anime was streamed on Crunchyroll with English subtitles.


Episodes

References

External links
Official Anime Website 

Maoyu